Lukusuzi National Park is located in eastern Luangwa Valley in Zambia, on the other side of the Luangwa River from the more famous South Luangwa National Park. It lies between the smaller Luambe National Park (on the eastern bank of the river) and the Chipata-Lundazi road. Much of the park is plateau dissected by rocky ridges and rugged valleys. The main ecoregion in which the park lies is the southern miombo woodlands characterised by the miombo trees interspersed with grassland. At lower elevations, such as at the bottom of the Luangwa valley, miombo give way to mopane trees.

The park is home to a sizable population of African wild dogs, an endangered species.

A dirt road runs east–west through the park, but there are no visitor facilities.

See also

Wildlife of Zambia

External links
Lukusuzi National Park

National parks of Zambia
Geography of Eastern Province, Zambia
Tourist attractions in Eastern Province, Zambia
Important Bird Areas of Zambia